Michael Stocklasa (born 2 December 1980) is a retired international footballer from Liechtenstein who played as a defender. Stocklasa played club football for USV Eschen/Mauren, and formerly played for FC Vaduz, FC Winterthur and FC Baden.

Personal life
His brother Martin Stocklasa was also a professional footballer and represented Liechtenstein at international level.

International career
Stocklasa played his final match for Liechtenstein in February 2012 before deciding to end his footballing days to focus on his business career.

International goals
Scores and results list.

References

External links
 

1980 births
Living people
Liechtenstein footballers
Liechtenstein international footballers
FC Vaduz players
FC Baden players
FC Winterthur players
Association football defenders